Dahira viksinjaevi is a moth of the family Sphingidae which is known from China.

It is distinguishable from all other Dahira species by the almost uniformly black upperside, only the forewing upperside has bluish-grey markings running in a diffuse curved subapical line. The underside of the thorax and abdomen is red-brown. The abdominal sternites have dark brown distal margins. The forewing underside is red-brown, although the basal area and marginal band are dark brown. The hindwing underside is red-brown and the tornus and inner margin are dark brown.

References

External links

viksinjaevi
Moths described in 2006
Endemic fauna of China
Moths of Asia